This is a list of women writers who were born in Chile or whose writings are closely associated with that country.

A
Marjorie Agosín (born 1955), Chilean-American poet, memoirist, now lives in the United States 
Isabel Allende (born 1942), highly acclaimed Chilean-American novelist, journalist, columnist, magazine editor, children's writer
Marina Arrate (born 1957), poet, psychologist
Celinda Arregui (1864-1941), feminist politician, writer, teacher, suffrage activist 
Carmen Arriagada (1807–1888), letter writer, wrote in English and French

B
Maipina de la Barra (1834–1904), first Chilean woman to publish a travel journal
Pía Barros (born 1956), short story writer and novelist
María Luisa Bombal (1910–1980), acclaimed novelist, feminist
Martina Barros Borgoño (1850–1944), autobiographer, early feminist
Marta Brunet (1897–1967), novelist, short story writer

C
Elena Caffarena (1903–2003), politician, women's rights activist, non-fiction writer
Mariana Callejas (1932–2016), writer and DINA agent
Mabel Condemarín (1931–2004), educator, textbook writer, children's writer
Ivonne Coñuecar (born 1980), writer, poet, journalist
Mariana Cox Méndez (1871–1914), novelist, short story writer, columnist, feminist
María de la Cruz (1912–1995), suffragist, journalist, poet, novelist, magazine editor

D
Achta Saleh Damane (fl. 2010s), journalist and politician
Delia Domínguez (1931–2022), poet
Gloria Dünkler (born 1977), poet and librarian

E
Diamela Eltit (born 1947), educator, novelist
Gabriela Etcheverry (born 1946), writer living in Canada

F
Soledad Fariña Vicuña (born 1943), widely translated poet
María Luisa Fernández (1870–1938), writer, editor, and poet
Paulina Flores (born 1988), short story writer

G
María Elena Gertner (1932–2013), writer, actress
Isabel Gómez Muñoz (born 1959), poet
Olga Grau (born 1945), writer, professor, philosopher
Carla Guelfenbein (born 1959), novelist, screenwriter
Viviana Guzmán (born 1982), flutist, poet

J
Andrea Jeftanovic (born 1970), novelist, short story writer, essayist
Pamela Jiles (born 1960), investigative journalist, poet, television presenter

M
Carmen Marai (Carmen María Bassa Rodríguez, living) poet and novelist
Lina Meruane (born 1970), writer and professor
Gabriela Mistral (1889–1957), pen name of Lucila Godoy Alcayaga (1889–1957), winner of the Nobel Prize in Literature, poet, educator, feminist
María Olivia Mönckeberg (born 1944), journalist, essayist, and academic
Yolanda Montecinos (1927–2007), journalist, television presenter
Isabel Morel (1885–?), journalist, magazine editor, feminist
Henrietta Müller (1846–1906), Chilean-British journalist, feminist
Rosabetty Muñoz (born 1960), poet and professor

P
Marcela Paz, pen name of Esther Huneeus Salas de Claro (1902–1985), children's writer, creator of Papelucho
Josefa de los Dolores Peña y Lillo Barbosa (1739–1823), letter writer, poet
Magdalena Petit (1903–1968), popular novelist, playwright, essayist, biographer
Monica Pidgeon (1913–2009), Chilean-British editor of Architectural Design

R
Carmen Rodríguez (born 1948), Chilean-Canadian poet, short story writer, educator,
Winétt de Rokha, pen name of  Luisa Anabalón Sanderson (1892–1951), poet

S
Lake Sagaris (born 1956), Canadian journalist, non-fiction writer, poet, translator, now living in Chile
Elvira Santa Cruz Ossa (1886–1960), playwright, novelist, magazine editor
Raquel Señoret (1922–1990), poet
Elisa Serrana (1930–2012), novelist
Marcela Serrano (born 1951), novelist
Pilar Sordo (born 1965), psychologist, columnist, lecturer, and writer

U
Matilde Urrutia (1912–1985), memoirist

V
Mercedes Valdivieso (1924–1993), pioneering feminist writer, novelist, author of La Brecha
Patricia Verdugo (1947–2008), investigative journalist, human rights activist, non-fiction writer
Luz de Viana (1900–1995), feminist writer also known as Marta Villanueva

W
Brígida Walker (1863–1942), educator, non-fiction writer
Teresa Wilms Montt (1893–1921), poet, novelist, feminist

Y
 María Flora Yáñez (1898–1982), novelist and short story writer

See also
List of women writers
List of Spanish-language authors

-
Chilean women writers, List of
Writers
Writers